Artem Valeryevich Levin (born December 8, 1986), also known as Artem "The Lion" Levin, is a Russian middleweight Muay Thai kickboxer fighting out of Prokopyevsk.

He is the former Glory Middleweight Champion, as well as the former It's Showtime 77 MAX champion.

He was ranked as a top ten middleweight by Combat Press between September 2014 and March 2022, peaking at #3.

Career

Early years
He is the captain of Russian National Muaythai Team. He's become Chairman of the Athletes Commission at IFMA since 2012.

Artem moved up to light heavyweight after the SportAccord Combat Games in 2010.

The much-anticipated fight between Artem Levin and Simon Marcus was scheduled for the third time and set for December 21, 2012, in Ekaterinburg, Russia and then February 23, 2013, before eventually settling on March 15, 2013, at Lion Fight 9 in Las Vegas with the inaugural Lion Fight Light Heavyweight Championship will be on the line. Although a closely contested bout, it was Marcus' clinching skills that made the difference as he took the unanimous decision win.

Glory
Moving up to 85 kg/187 lb, Levin defeated Sahak Parparyan via an extension round decision at Glory 7: Milan in Milan, Italy on April 20, 2013.

He competed in the four man 85 kg/187 lb tournament at Glory 10: Los Angeles - Middleweight World Championship Tournament in Ontario, California, United States on September 28, 2013. After cruising to a unanimous decision over Jason Wilnis in the semi-finals, he lost out to Joe Schilling in the final. He took round one but was knocked down in two when Schilling connected with a right overhand followed by a knee. The bout was ruled a draw after three rounds and went to an extension round in which Schilling scored a controversial knockdown and took the unanimous decision and the belt.

He was scheduled to fight Hicham El Gaoui for the WKN light heavyweight title at Diamond Fight: Friendship in Chelyabinsk, Russia on December 13, 2013 but the match fell through.

Levin defeated Robert Thomas via UD at Glory 16: Denver in Broomfield, Colorado, US on April 3, 2014.

Artem Levin was expected to rematch Simon Marcus in a fight for the WMC World Light Heavyweight (175 lbs/79.379 kg) Championship at Monte Carlo Fighting Masters 2014 in Monte Carlo, Monaco on June 14, 2014. The bout was cancelled, however, in order for fighters to compete at Glory 17: Los Angeles which was held a week later.

Glory Middleweight Championship
Levin won the Glory 17: Los Angeles - Last Man Standing middleweight tournament and the inaugural Glory Middleweight Championship in Inglewood, California, on June 21, 2014, defeating Alex Pereira in the quarter-finals and Filip Verlinden in the semis, both by clear-cut unanimous decision, before rematching Joe Schilling in the final. He scored a knockdown with a spinning backfist in round one, but was docked a point by referee Al Wichgers for excessive clinching in three. He did enough to win, however, taking another UD, with all three judges scoring the bout 29-26 in favour of Levin.

Levin had his first title defense against Simon Marcus during Glory 21: San Diego. Levin successfully defended the title, as the fight ended in a majority draw. Referee Marcos Rosales took a point away from Levin in the third round for excessive clinching, with Levin later stating: "The rules allow five-second clinch, active clinch. I am quick, I am hitting knees. This is not right, what they do. I do not like it." Marcus was likewise unhappy with how the fight played out, stating: "This is bullshit, I won this fight."

Briefly moving away from Glory, Levin fought Daniel Alexandru for the WKN World Cruiserweight Muay thai title. Levin won the fight in the second round, knocking Alexandru out in the second round with a knee strike.

Controversial title loss
Levin's second Glory title defense was a rematch with Simon Marcus during Glory 27: Chicago. In the first round of the fight, referee Al Wichgers gave Levin a ten count after Levin was pushed down. In the second and third round, the referee took points away from Levin for, what he deemed to be, excessive clinching. Levin decided to leave the ring in the third round. The referee's actions during the bout, and the end of the fight itself were highly controversial, with one reporter claiming it was "one of the greatest embarrassments in the history of Glory, if not in the history of kickboxing." Following this fight, Levin decided to leave Glory, with both parties agreeing to mutually terminate his contract.

Late years
Levin won a unanimous decision against Ali El Ameri during Friendship Cup 11, after which Levin took a two year break from kickboxing. He returned in April 2018 to fight Igor Bugaenko during ACB KB 15: Grand Prix Kitek for the ACB KB Middleweight Title. He won the fight by unanimous decision. He would later be named the vice president of ACB kickboxing.

In his next two fights, Levin scored decision wins over David Mirkovsky and Zhou Wei.

Titles

Professional
Absolute Championship Berkut
2018 ACB KB Middleweight Champion
World Kickboxing Network
2015 WKN World Cruiserweight (-88.5 kg) Muay Thai Champion
Glory
Glory Middleweight (-85 kg/187.4 lb) Championship (one time; first; one defense)
2014 Glory Middleweight (-85 kg/187.4 lb) Last Man Standing Tournament Champion
2013 Glory Middleweight (-85 kg/187.4 lb) World Championship Tournament Runner-up
WBC Muaythai
2011 WBC Muaythai World Light heavyweight (175 lbs/79.379 kg) champion (1 def.)
It's Showtime
2010 It's Showtime 77 MAX World Champion (1 def.)
The Contender Asia
2008 The Contender Asia Season 2 Russian qualifying tournament champion
Battle of Champions
2008 Battle of Champions tournament World Champion
World Muaythai Council
2007 WMC Intercontinental title at 76 kg
2007 WMC EMF European title at 76 kg

Amateur
2015 IFMA Russian Muaythai Champion  (86 kg)
2015 IFMA Best Athlete of the Year
2014 IFMA Russian Muaythai Champion  (86 kg)
2013 SportAccord World Combat Games Muaythai champion  (81 kg)
2013 IFMA Russian Muaythai Champion  (81 kg)
2012 IFMA World Muaythai champion  (81 kg)
2012 IFMA European Muaythai champion  (81 kg)
2011 IFMA European Muaythai champion  (81 kg)
2010 SportAccord World Combat Games Muaythai champion  (75 kg)
2010 IFMA European Muaythai champion  (75 kg)
2009 IFMA European Muaythai champion  (75 kg)
2008 Busan TAFISA World Games IFMA Muaythai champion  (75 kg)
2007 IFMA World Muaythai champion  (75 kg)
2006 IFMA World Muaythai champion  (75 kg)
2006 WMF World Muaythai champion  (75 kg)
2005 WMF World Muaythai champion  (67 kg)
2004 IFMA European Muaythai champion  (67 kg)
2003–2011 IFMA Russian Muaythai Champion

Professional kickboxing record

|-  bgcolor="#CCFFCC"
| 2019-09-20 || Win ||align=left| Zhou Wei || Wu Lin Feng 2019: WLF China vs Russia || Moscow, Russia || DEC (Unanimous) || 3 || 3:00 ||  
|-  bgcolor="#CCFFCC"
| 2018-05-30 || Win ||align=left| David Mirkovsky || Zhara Fight Show || Moscow, Russia || DEC (Unanimous) || 3 || 3:00 ||  
|-  bgcolor="#CCFFCC"
| 2018-04-20 || Win ||align=left| Igor Bugaenko || ACB KB 15: Grand Prix Kitek || Moscow, Russia || DEC || 5 || 3:00 ||  
|-
! style=background:white colspan=9 |
|-
|-  bgcolor="#CCFFCC"
| 2016-10-29 || Win ||align=left| Ali El Ameri || Friendship Cup 11 || Novosibirsk, Russia || DEC (Unanimous) || 3 || 3:00 || 
|-
|-  bgcolor="#FFBBBB"
| 2016-02-26 || Loss ||align=left| Simon Marcus || Glory 27: Chicago || Hoffman Estates, Illinois, USA || DQ (forfeit) || 3 || 2:55 || 
|- 
! style=background:white colspan=9 |
|-
|-  bgcolor="#CCFFCC"
| 2015-12-19 || Win || align=left| Daniel Alexandru || Muay Thai Moscow || Moscow, Russia || KO (Knee) || 2 || 2:32 || 
|-
! style=background:white colspan=9 |
|-
|-  bgcolor="#c5d2ea"
| 2015-05-08 || Draw ||align=left| Simon Marcus || Glory 21: San Diego || San Diego, California, USA || DEC (majority) || 5 || 3:00 || 
|- 
! style=background:white colspan=9 |
|-
|-  bgcolor="#CCFFCC"
| 2014-06-21 || Win ||align=left| Joe Schilling || Glory 17: Los Angeles - Tournament, Final || Inglewood, California, USA || DEC (unanimous) || 3 || 3:00 || 
|- 
! style=background:white colspan=9 |
|-
|-  bgcolor="#CCFFCC"
| 2014-06-21 || Win ||align=left| Filip Verlinden || Glory 17: Los Angeles - Tournament, Semi Finals || Inglewood, California, USA || DEC (unanimous) || 3 || 3:00 || 
|-
|-  bgcolor="#CCFFCC"
| 2014-06-21 || Win ||align=left| Alex Pereira || Glory 17: Los Angeles - Tournament, Quarter Finals || Inglewood, California, USA || DEC (unanimous) || 3 || 3:00 ||  
|- 
|-  bgcolor="#CCFFCC"
| 2014-05-03 || Win ||align=left| Robert Thomas || Glory 16: Denver || Broomfield, Colorado, USA || DEC (unanimous) || 3 || 3:00 || 
|-
|-  bgcolor="#FFBBBB"
| 2013-09-28 || Loss || align=left| Joe Schilling || Glory 10: Los Angeles - Tournament, Final || Ontario, California, USA || Ext. round DEC (unanimous) || 4 || 3:00 || 
|-
! style=background:white colspan=9 |
|-
|-  bgcolor="#CCFFCC"
| 2013-09-28 || Win || align=left| Jason Wilnis || Glory 10: Los Angeles - Tournament, Semi Finals || Ontario, California, USA || DEC (unanimous) || 3 || 3:00 || 
|-
|-  bgcolor="#CCFFCC"
| 2013-04-20 || Win || align=left| Sahak Parparyan || Glory 7: Milan || Milan, Italy || Ext. round DEC (unanimous) || 4 || 3:00 || 
|-
|-  bgcolor="#FFBBBB"
| 2013-03-15 || Loss ||align=left| Simon Marcus || Lion Fight 9 || Las Vegas, Nevada, USA || DEC (unanimous) || 5 || 3:00 || 
|-
! style=background:white colspan=9 |
|-
|-  bgcolor="#c5d2ea"
| 2012-07-07 || Draw ||align=left| Steven Wakeling || Xplosion Muay Thai || England || DEC || 5 || 3:00 || 
|-
|-  bgcolor="#CCFFCC"
| 2012-03-03 || Win ||align=left| Cheick Sidibe || Martial Arts Festival "For Russia" - 2 || Chelyabinsk, Russia || TKO || 4 ||  || 
|-
! style=background:white colspan=9 |
|-
|-  bgcolor="#CCFFCC"
| 2011-11-26 || Win ||align=left| Dimitar Iliev || Forward Challenge Riga 2011 || Riga, Latvia || TKO (Referee stoppage) || 3 || || 
|-  bgcolor="#CCFFCC"
| 2011-11-06 || Win ||align=left| Roberto Cocco || Muay Thai Premier League: Round 3 || The Hague, Netherlands || KO || || || 
|-
|-  bgcolor="#CCFFCC"
| 2011-09-24 || Win ||align=left| Murthel Groenhart || It's Showtime "Fast & Furious 70MAX" || Brussels, Belgium || KO (Left Knee to the Body) || 5 || 1:51 || 
|-
! style=background:white colspan=9 |
|-
|-  bgcolor="#CCFFCC"
| 2011-09-02 || Win ||align=left| David Keclik || Muaythai Premier League: Round 1 || Long Beach, California, United States || KO (right flying knee)|| 3 || 2:28 || 
|-  bgcolor="#FFBBBB"
| 2011-06-11 || Loss ||align=left| Fu Gaofeng || Wushu vs Muaythai || China || DEC || 5 || 3:00 || 
|-
|-  bgcolor="#CCFFCC"
| 2011-02-23 || Win ||align=left| Kaoklai Kaennorsing || Martial Arts Festival "For Russia" || Chelyabinsk, Russia || DEC || 5 || 3:00 || 
|-
! style=background:white colspan=9 |
|-
|-  bgcolor="#CCFFCC"
| 2010-12-18 || Win ||align=left| L'houcine Ouzgni || Fightclub presents: It's Showtime 2010 || Amsterdam, Netherlands || TKO (Eye Injury) || 4 || 2:29 || 
|-
! style=background:white colspan=9 |
|-
|-  bgcolor="#CCFFCC"
| 2010-11-19 || Win ||align=left| Alexander Stetsurenko || Battle of Champions V - 81 kg || Moscow, Russia || DEC (Unanimous) || 3 || 3:00 || 
|-  bgcolor="#CCFFCC"
| 2010-07-29 || Win ||align=left| Artem Vakhitov || Tatneft Arena World Cup 2010 1/2 final (80 kg) || Kazan, Russia || TKO || 3 || 2:00 || 37-3
|-  bgcolor="#CCFFCC"
| 2010-04-30 || Win ||align=left| Pavel Kharchenko || Tatneft Arena World Cup 2010 1/4 final (80 kg) || Kazan, Russia || KO (Flying Knee) || 2 || 0:57 || 
|-  bgcolor="#CCFFCC"
| 2010-01-31 || Win ||align=left| Alexander Bruslavets || Tatneft Arena World Cup 2010 1/8 final (80 kg) || Kazan, Russia || TKO (Corner stoppage) || 2 || 3:00 || 
|-  bgcolor="#FFBBBB"
| 2009-10-23 || Loss ||align=left| Alexander Stetsurenko || Tatneft Arena European Cup 2009 final (80 kg) || Kazan, Russia || TKO || 4 || 3:00 ||
|-
! style=background:white colspan=9 |
|-
|-  bgcolor="#CCFFCC"
| 2009-09-26 || Win ||align=left| Dmitry Shakuta || Tatneft Arena European Cup 2009 1/2 final (80 kg) || Kazan, Russia || KO (Left spinning backfist) || 4 || 2:08 || 
|-  bgcolor="#CCFFCC"
| 2009-04-16 || Win ||align=left| Pavel Turuk || Tatneft Arena European Cup 2009 1/4 final (80 kg) || Kazan, Russia || DEC (Unanimous) || 3 || 3:00 || 
|-  bgcolor="#CCFFCC"
| 2009-01-31 || Win ||align=left| Vasile Cojocaru || Tatneft Arena European Cup 2009 1/8 final (80 kg) || Kazan, Russia || TKO (Corner stoppage/broken nose) || 3 || 2:48 || 
|-  bgcolor="#CCFFCC"
| 2008-12-19 || Win ||align=left| Vitaly Gurkov || The Contender Asia Qualifier|| Chelyabinsk, Russia || TKO || 1 || 3:00 || 
|-
! style=background:white colspan=9 |
|-
|-  bgcolor="#CCFFCC"
| 2008-12-19 || Win ||align=left| Dmitry Valent || The Contender Asia Qualifier|| Chelyabinsk, Russia || DEC || 3 || 3:00 || 
|-  bgcolor="#CCFFCC"
| 2008-12-19 || Win ||align=left| Ilter Demirci || The Contender Asia Qualifier|| Chelyabinsk, Russia || DEC || 3 || 3:00 || 
|-  bgcolor="#CCFFCC"
| 2008-12-05 || Win ||align=left| Maxim Balashko || Battle of Champions III|| Luzhniki, Moscow, Russia || DEC (unanimous) || 3 || 3:00 || 
|-  bgcolor=#FFBBBB
| 2008-05-31 || Loss ||align=left| Yodsaenklai Fairtex || K-1 Scandinavia MAX 2008 || Stockholm, Sweden || KO (Right hook) || 2 || 0:40 || 
|-
! style=background:white colspan=9 |
|-
|-  bgcolor="#CCFFCC"
| 2008-05-09 || Win ||align=left| Richard Jones || Battle of Champions tournament || Chelyabinsk, Russia || KO (Elbow) || 1 ||  || 
|-
! style=background:white colspan=9 |
|-
|-  bgcolor="#CCFFCC"
| 2008-05-09 || Win ||align=left| Winston Martens || Battle of Champions tournament || Chelyabinsk, Russia || DEC || 3 || 3:00 || 
|-  bgcolor="#CCFFCC"
| 2008-03-28 || Win ||align=left| Alexander Stetsurenko || Tournament of Real Men 12 || Ekaterinburg, Russia || DEC (Unanimous) || 5 || 3:00 || 
|-
! style=background:white colspan=9 |
|-
|-  bgcolor="#CCFFCC"
| 2007-11-03 || Win ||align=left| Vitor Pereira || Siberia Ice Sports Palace || Novosibirsk, Russia || KO (Left knee strike) || 1 ||  || 
|-
! style=background:white colspan=9 |
|-
|-  bgcolor="#CCFFCC"
| 2007-08-24 || Win ||align=left| Slaton Lookbangyai || Thailand vs Russia IV || Kemerovo, Russia || KO (Left knee strike) || 2 ||  || 10-1 
|-  bgcolor="#CCFFCC"
| 2007-08-10 || Win ||align=left| Nonsai Sirisuk || Snezhinka Sports Palace || Prokopyevsk, Russia || KO (Left knee strike) || 4 || 1:45 || 
|-
! style=background:white colspan=9 |
|-
|-  bgcolor="#CCFFCC"
| 2007-05-20 || Win ||align=left| Nonthanun Por. Pramuk || K-1 Scandinavia GP 2007 || Stockholm, Sweden || DEC (Unanimous) || 3 || 3:00 || 
|-  bgcolor="#FFBBBB"
| 2006-10-24 || Loss ||align=left| Mikhail Chalykh || Fighting the World || Novocibirsk, Russia || DEC || 3 || 3:00 || 5-1
|-  bgcolor="#CCFFCC"
| 2006-08-26 || Win ||align=left| Tum Mardsua || Thailand vs Russia III || Kemerovo, Russia || KO (Left knee strike) || 4 ||  || 3-0
|-  bgcolor="#CCFFCC"
| 2005-06-12 || Win ||align=left| Slaton Lookbangyai || Thailand vs Russia II|| Kemerovo, Russia || KO (Elbows) || 2 ||  || 2-0
|-  bgcolor="#CCFFCC"
| 2004-12-18 || Win ||align=left| Surasak Dekli || Thailand vs Russia I || Kemerovo, Russia || DEC (Unanimous) || 5 || 3:00 || 1-0
|-
| colspan=9 | Legend:    

|-  bgcolor="#CCFFCC"
| 2015-11-08 || Win ||align=left| Armen Petrosian || Russian National Muaythai Championship, final (86 kg) || Magnitogorsk, Russia || DEC || 3 || 3:00 || 
|-
! style=background:white colspan=9 |
|-
|-  bgcolor="#CCFFCC"
| 2015-11-07 || Win ||align=left| Mikhail Sartakov || Russian National Muaythai Championship, semifinal (86 kg)|| Magnitogorsk, Russia || DEC || 3 || 3:00 || 
|-
|-  bgcolor="#CCFFCC"
| 2015-11-05 || Win ||align=left| Dmitry Khabibullin || Russian National Muaythai Championship, quarterfinal (86 kg) || Magnitogorsk, Russia || TKO || 1 || 0:30 || 
|-
|-  bgcolor="#CCFFCC"
| 2014-08-30 || Win ||align=left| Armen Petrosian || Russian National Muaythai Championship, final (86 kg) || Sevastopol || DEC || 3 || 3:00 || 
|-
! style=background:white colspan=9 |
|-
|-  bgcolor="#CCFFCC"
| 2014-08-28 || Win ||align=left| Vladislav Zhilenko || Russian National Muaythai Championship, quarterfinal (86 kg) || Sevastopol || KO || 1 || 3:00 || 
|-  bgcolor="#CCFFCC"
| 2013-10-23 || Win || align=left| Dmitry Valent || SportAccord World Combat Games, final (81 kg)|| Saint-Petersburg, Russia || DEC || 3 || 3:00 || 
|-
! style=background:white colspan=9 |
|-
|-  bgcolor="#CCFFCC"
| 2013-10-21 || Win || align=left| Boumama Kadda || SportAccord World Combat Games, semifinal (81 kg)|| Saint-Petersburg, Russia || DEC || 3 || 3:00 || 
|-
|-  bgcolor="#CCFFCC"
| 2013-10-19 || Win || align=left| Damian Bujan || SportAccord World Combat Games, quarterfinal (81 kg)|| Saint-Petersburg, Russia || DEC || 3 || 3:00 || 
|-
|-  bgcolor="#CCFFCC"
| 2013-08-22 || Win || align=left| Evgeny Lyrschikov || Russian National Muaythai Championship, final (81 kg)|| Kemerovo, Russia || DEC || 3 || 3:00 || 
|-
! style=background:white colspan=9 |
|-
|-  bgcolor="#CCFFCC"
| 2013-08-21 || Win || align=left| Nikolay Filonov || Russian National Muaythai Championship, semifinal (81 kg) || Kemerovo, Russia || DEC || 3 || 3:00 || 
|-
|-  bgcolor="#CCFFCC"
| 2013-08-19 || Win || align=left| Ahmed Ozdoev || Russian National Muaythai Championship, quarterfinal (81 kg) || Kemerovo, Russia || TKO || 1 || 3:00 || 
|-
|-  bgcolor="#CCFFCC"
| 2012-09-13 || Win ||align=left| Marc de Bonte || IFMA 2012 World Muaythai Championships, final (81 kg) || Saint-Petersburg, Russia || DEC || 4 ||3:00 || 
|-
! style=background:white colspan=9 |
|- 
|-  bgcolor="#CCFFCC"
| 2012-09-11 || Win ||align=left| Dmitry Abdullin || IFMA 2012 World Muaythai Championships, semifinal (81 kg) || Saint-Petersburg, Russia || TKO || 3 ||3:00 || 
|-
|-  bgcolor="#CCFFCC"
| 2012-09-10 || Win ||align=left| Rickard Pettersson || IFMA 2012 World Muaythai Championships, quarterfinal (81 kg) || Saint-Petersburg, Russia || DEC || 4 || 3:00 || 
|-
|-  bgcolor="#CCFFCC"
| 2012-09-07 || Win ||align=left| Jabar Al-Kinani || IFMA 2012 World Muaythai Championships, preliminary bout (81 kg) || Saint-Petersburg, Russia || TKO (Knee to the body) || 3 || 1:35 || 
|-
|-  bgcolor="#CCFFCC"
| 2012-04-22 || Win ||align=left| Filip Kulawinski || IFMA 2012 European Muaythai Championships, final (81 kg) || Antalya, Turkey || DEC || 4 ||3:00 || 
|-
! style=background:white colspan=9 |
|-
|-  bgcolor="#CCFFCC"
| 2012-04-21 || Win ||align=left| Dmitry Abdullin || IFMA 2012 European Muaythai Championships, 1/2 final (81 kg) || Antalya, Turkey || DEC || 4 || || 
|-
|-  bgcolor="#CCFFCC"
| 2012-04-19 || Win ||align=left| Boumama Kadda || IFMA 2011 European Muaythai Championships, 1/4 final (81 kg) || Antalya, Turkey || DEC || 4 || || 
|-
|-  bgcolor="#CCFFCC"
| 2011-04-29 || Win ||align=left| Rasmus Zøylner || IFMA 2011 European Muaythai Championships, final (81 kg) || Antalya, Turkey || Decision  || 4 || 2:00 || 
|-
! style=background:white colspan=9 |
|-
|-  bgcolor="#CCFFCC"
| 2011-04-28 || Win ||align=left| Boumama Kadda || IFMA 2011 European Muaythai Championships, 1/2 final (81 kg) || Antalya, Turkey || TKO (Corner Stoppage) || 2 || 2:35 || 
|-  bgcolor="#CCFFCC"
| 2011-04-27 || Win ||align=left| Dmitry Abdullin || IFMA 2011 European Muaythai Championships, 1/4 final (81 kg) || Antalya, Turkey || Decision  || 4 || 2:00 || 
|-  bgcolor="#CCFFCC"
| 2011-04-25 || Win ||align=left| Jokke Siljuberg || IFMA 2011 European Muaythai Championships, 1/8 final (81 kg) || Antalya, Turkey || Decision (5:0) outclassed || 4 || 2:00 || 
|-  bgcolor="#CCFFCC"
| 2010-09-02 || Win ||align=left| Yodsaenklai Fairtex || 2010 World Combat Games -75 kg Muay Thai, Final || Beijing, China || Decision (3:2) || 4 || 2:00 || 
|-
! style=background:white colspan=9 |
|-
|-  bgcolor="#CCFFCC"
| 2010-08-31 || Win ||align=left| Jesse Lacombe || 2010 World Combat Games -75 kg Muay Thai, Semi finals || Beijing, China ||  ||  ||  ||
|-  bgcolor="#CCFFCC"
| 2010-08-29 || Win ||align=left| Emil Zoraj || 2010 World Combat Games -75 kg Muay Thai, Quarter finals || Beijing, China || Decision (5:0) || 4 || 2:00 || 
|-  bgcolor="#CCFFCC"
| 2010-05-30 || Win ||align=left| Niels Peter Larsen || IFMA 2010 European Muaythai Championships final (75 kg) || Velletri, Italy || TKO (Right Cross) || 1 || 2:00 || 
|-
! style=background:white colspan=9 |
|-
|-  bgcolor="#CCFFCC"
| 2010-05-29 || Win ||align=left| Vladimir Artemenko || IFMA 2010 European Muaythai Championships 1/2 final (75 kg) || Velletri, Italy || Decision || 4 || 2:00 || 
|-  bgcolor="#CCFFCC"
| 2010-05-27 || Win ||align=left| Dmitry Valent || IFMA 2010 European Muaythai Championships 1/4 final (75 kg) || Velletri, Italy || Decision (5:0) || 4 || 2:00 || 
|-  bgcolor="#CCFFCC"
| 2010-05-26 || Win ||align=left| Emil Zoraj || IFMA 2010 European Muaythai Championships 1/8 final(75 kg) || Velletri, Italy || Decision (5:0) || 4 || 2:00 || 
|-  bgcolor="#FFBBBB"
| 2009-12-01 || Loss ||align=left| Emil Zoraj || IFMA 2009 World Muaythai Championships 1/4 finals (75 kg) || Bangkok, Thailand || Decision || 4 || 2:00 || 
|-  bgcolor="#CCFFCC"
| 2009-11-30 || Win ||align=left| K. Sapchakhorn || IFMA 2009 World Muaythai Championships || Bangkok, Thailand || TKO (Referee stoppage) ||  ||  || 
|-  bgcolor="#CCFFCC"
| 2009-05-22 || Win ||align=left| Ivan Grigoriev || IFMA European Amateur Muaythai championships || Liepāja, Latvia || Decision || 4 || 2:00 || 
|-  bgcolor="#CCFFCC"
| 2009-05-20 || Win ||align=left| Dmitry Valent || IFMA European Amateur Muaythai championships || Liepāja, Latvia || Decision || 4 || 2:00 || 
|-
! style=background:white colspan=9 |
|-
|-  bgcolor="#CCFFCC"
| 2009-05-19 || Win ||align=left| Waldemar Wiebe || IFMA European Amateur Muaythai championships || Liepāja, Latvia || Decision (5:0) outclassed || 4 || 2:00 || 
|-  bgcolor=#CCFFCC
| 2008-10-03 || Win ||align=left| Jan de Kayzer || 4th Busan TAFISA World Games || Busan, Korea || Decision || 4 || 2:00 || 
|-
! style=background:white colspan=9 |
|-
|-  bgcolor=#CCFFCC
| 2008-09-30 || Win ||align=left| Tarik Slimani || 4th Busan TAFISA World Games || Busan, Korea || Decision || 4 || 2:00 || 
|-  bgcolor="#CCFFCC"
| 2008-09-28 || Win ||align=left| Ivan Grigoriev || 4th Busan TAFISA World Games || Busan, Korea || Decision || 4 || 2:00 || 
|-
|-  bgcolor=#CCFFCC
| 2008-09-27 || Win ||align=left| Oman Matevz || 4th Busan TAFISA World Games || Busan, Korea || TKO (Referee stoppage) || 1 ||  || 
|-
|-  bgcolor="#CCFFCC"
| 2007-12-05 || Win ||align=left| Yuri Gorbachov || WMC IFMA World Muaythai Championships || Bangkok, Thailand || Decision || 4 || 2:00 || 
|-
! style=background:white colspan=9 |
|-
|-  bgcolor="#CCFFCC"
| 2007-12-04 || Win ||align=left| Petr Nakonechnyi || WMC IFMA World Muaythai Championships || Bangkok, Thailand || Decision || 4 || 2:00 || 
|-  bgcolor="#CCFFCC"
| 2007-12-03 || Win ||align=left| Amnart Noenhrathok || WMC IFMA World Muaythai Championships || Bangkok, Thailand || Decision || 4 || 2:00 || 
|-  bgcolor="#CCFFCC"
| 2007-11-29 || Win ||align=left| Ahmet Labinot || WMC IFMA World Muaythai Championships || Bangkok, Thailand || TKO (Referee stoppage) || 2 ||  || 
|-  bgcolor="#CCFFCC"
| 2007-06-28 || Win ||align=left| Serhat Sener || Muaythai Russia vs Turkey || Moscow, Russia || DEC ||  ||  || 
|-  bgcolor="#CCFFCC"
| 2006-06-07 || Win ||align=left| Petr Nakonechnyi || WMC IFMA World Muaythai Championships finals || Bangkok, Thailand ||  ||  ||  || 
|-
! style=background:white colspan=9 |
|-
|-  bgcolor="#CCFFCC"
| 2006-06-06 || Win ||align=left| Yuri Gorbachov || WMC IFMA World Muaythai Championships 1/2 finals || Bangkok, Thailand || || || || 
|-  bgcolor="#CCFFCC"
| 2006-06-05 || Win ||align=left| Cheick Sidibe || WMC IFMA World Muaythai Championships 1/4 finals || Bangkok, Thailand || || || || 
|-  bgcolor="#CCFFCC"
| 2006-06-02 || Win ||align=left| Dam Sricham || WMC IFMA World Muaythai Championships 1/8 finals || Bangkok, Thailand || || || || 
|-  bgcolor="#CCFFCC"
| 2006-03-26 || Win ||align=left| Jonathan Camara || WMF World Muaythai Championships finals || Bangkok, Thailand || || || || 
|-
! style=background:white colspan=9 |
|-
|-  bgcolor="#CCFFCC"
| 2006-03-24 || Win ||align=left| Spirk Srdan || WMF World Muaythai Championships 1/2 finals || Bangkok, Thailand || || || || 
|-  bgcolor="#CCFFCC"
| 2005-05-00 || Win ||align=left| Elgam Arabalaev || Russian Muaythai Championships finals || Arzamas, Russia || Decision (5:0) || 4 || 2:00 || 
|-
! style=background:white colspan=9 |
|- 
|-  bgcolor="#CCFFCC"
| 2005-05-00 || Win ||align=left| Alexander Vitkin || Russian Muaythai Championships || Arzamas, Russia || KO || || || 
|-  bgcolor="#CCFFCC"
| 2005-03-26 || Win ||align=left| || WMF World Muaythai Championships finals || Bangkok, Thailand || Decision (5:0) || 4 || 2:00 || 
|-
! style=background:white colspan=9 |
|-
|-  bgcolor="#CCFFCC"
| 2005-03-24 || Win ||align=left| Rachamom Sarakhamom || WMF World Muaythai Championships 1/2 finals || Bangkok, Thailand || Decision (5:0) || 4 || 2:00 || 
|-  bgcolor="#CCFFCC"
| 2005-03-19 || Win ||align=left| Ali Soueda || WMF World Muaythai Championships 1/4 finals || Bangkok, Thailand || Decision || 4 || 2:00 || 
|-  bgcolor="#CCFFCC"
| 2005-03-17 || Win ||align=left| Adam Pengsavang || WMF World Muaythai Championships 1/8 finals || Bangkok, Thailand || Decision || 4 || 2:00 ||
|-
| colspan=9 | Legend:

Boxing record

|-  bgcolor="#CCFFCC"
| 2008-02-23 || Win ||align=left| Vladimir Chuklin || TITOV/RCC BOXING PROMOTIONS || Kemerovo, Russia || TKO || 2 || 2:56 || 1-0
|-
| colspan=9 | Legend:

See also 
List of K-1 events
List of It's Showtime champions
List of male kickboxers

References

External links 
 Kuzbass Muay Thai
 FansOfK-1 profile
 Personal site

1986 births
Living people
Russian male kickboxers
Light heavyweight kickboxers
Super-middleweight boxers
Russian Muay Thai practitioners
People from Prokopyevsk
Russian male boxers
Glory kickboxers
Sportspeople from Kemerovo Oblast